Waikato Draught is a New Zealand Draught-style Bitter beer brewed by Lion. It is mainly sold in the Waikato region of New Zealand, but can also be found in stores elsewhere in New Zealand and abroad.

History 
Waikato draught was first brewed in 1925. Willie the waiter, a cartoon character used to promote the beer was created in 1945. At this time Waikato Draught was selling 400,000 gallons of beer each year and was being brewed from the Innes Family Waikato Brewery.

It is thought that the Innes Family Waikato Brewery was the first brewery to be fully owned by a woman (Mary Jane Innes) in New Zealand.

In 1961 New Zealand Breweries (later to become Lion Nathan) acquired Waikato Breweries from CL Innes. The brewery stayed open in Hamilton until 1987 when it was closed down.
From this time production of Waikato Draught was moved to the Lion Breweries in Newmarket, Auckland.

In 2005 Waikato Draught was awarded a gold medal in the NZ draught category at the BrewNZ New Zealand beer awards.

The manufacturer claims that Waikato Draught has a strong malty flavour with a well-defined bitterness.

References

External links 

1925 establishments in Australia
Beer in New Zealand
Kirin Group